Kenny Mitchell is a former US professional boxer.

Kenny Mitchell may also refer to:

 Kenny Mitchell (basketball), US collegiate basketball player in the 1996–97 NCAA Division I men's basketball season
 Kenny Mitchell (footballer), English footballer

See also 
 Kenneth Mitchell (disambiguation)